The College of Letters and Science is the largest college at the University of California, Santa Barbara.
The College, which offers 90 majors and 38 minors to over 20,000 undergraduates and 2,000 graduate students, has about 700 faculty members.

Academics

Degrees
The college offers the Bachelor of Arts,  Bachelor of Fine Arts, Bachelor of Science, Master of Science, and Doctor of Philosophy degrees.

Departments and Programs
Forty-seven academic departments and programs within the College of Letters and Science are grouped into three academic divisions: the Division of Humanities and Fine Arts; the Division of Mathematical, Life, and Physical Sciences; and the Division of Social Sciences.  The College’s Division of Undergraduate Education offers academic services to the undergraduates and administers the Honors Program.

The Division of Humanities and Fine Arts includes 22 academic departments and programs:
 Department of Art
 Department of Classics
 Comparative Literature Program
 Department of East Asian Languages and Cultural Studies
 Department of English
 English for Multilingual Students Program
 Department of Film and Media Studies
 Department of French and Italian
 Department of Germanic, Slavic, and Semitic Studies
 Department of History
 Department of the History of Art and Architecture
 Program in Latin American and Iberian Studies
 Department of Linguistics
 Graduate Program in Media Arts and Technology (joint with College of Engineering)
 Program in Medieval Studies
 Department of Music
 Department of Philosophy
 Department of Religious Studies
 Renaissance Studies Program
 Department of Spanish and Portuguese
 Department of Theater and Dance
 Writing Program

The Division of Mathematical, Life, and Physical Sciences includes 14 academic departments and programs:
 Graduate Program in Biomolecular Science and Engineering (joint with College of Engineering)
 Department of Chemistry and Biochemistry
 Department of Earth Science
 Department of Ecology, Evolution, and Marine Biology
 Program in Environmental Studies
 Program in Financial Mathematics and Statistics
 Department of Geography
 Graduate Program in Marine Science
 Department of Mathematics
 Department of Molecular, Cellular, and Developmental Biology
 Department of Physics
 Department of Psychological and Brain Sciences
 Department of Speech and Hearing Sciences
 Department of Statistics and Applied Probability

The Division of Social Sciences includes 11 academic departments and programs:
 Department of Anthropology
 Department of Asian American Studies
 Department of Black Studies
 Department of Chicana and Chicano Studies
 Department of Communication
 Department of Economics
 Department of Feminist Studies
 Global and International Studies Program
 Department of Military Science
 Department of Political Science
 Department of Sociology

Faculty
The college has about 700 faculty members engaged in teaching and research.  The L&S faculty includes four Nobel Prize laureates and  29 members of the National Academy of Sciences.

Publications
Convergence is the magazine of Engineering and the Sciences at UC Santa Barbara. Sponsored by the College of Engineering, the Division of Mathematical, Life, and Physical Sciences in the College of Letters and Science, and the California NanoSystems Institute, Convergence was begun in early 2005 as a three-times-a-year print publication. It is available online and in print.

See also
 University of California, Santa Barbara

References

External links
 UCSB College of Letters and Science

College of Letters and Science
University subdivisions in California
Liberal arts colleges at universities in the United States